The Collins Zoo, formerly the Collins Exotic Animal Orphanage, is a zoo located in Collins, Mississippi.

History
The Collins Zoo was founded in 1986 by Gus White. The zoo has been raided several times by the Mississippi Department of Wildlife, Fisheries and Parks. MDWF&P have never won a single case against the Zoo. The last raid was ruled unconstitutional. The MDWF&P have stated that the owners did not have proper permits, but several judges ruled that the owners were exempt from permits.

The zoo's USDA license was revoked in May, 2013. The zoo has been closed since that time.

Animals

African Lions, tigers, cougars, and leopards are several of the major attractions at the Collins Zoo.

A white wolf is featured in the center of the zoo.

There are over forty different species of snakes, lizards, and turtles in the zoo.

Other attractions

Petting zoo
Souvenir shop
Animal feedings

Legal issues with the State of Mississippi
In 2001, state wildlife officials raided the zoo and seized several skunks, alligators, alligator snapping turtles, bobcats, and several other species of animals indigenous to Mississippi.

In March 2010, the zoo was again raided by the Mississippi Department of Wildlife and an opossum, red-eared slider turtles, and some box turtles were taken. The zoo was issued 22 citations, many for "lack of permits for inherently violent animals."

The latest raid on January 25, 2012, included three tigers, three cougars, two leopards, two wolf hybrids, and one rhesus macaque monkey. The animals are being relocated to sanctuaries in Texas and North Carolina.

Notes

External links 

Zoos in Mississippi
Landmarks in Mississippi
1986 establishments in Mississippi
Buildings and structures in Covington County, Mississippi
Tourist attractions in Covington County, Mississippi